Jashore Sadar is an upazila of Jashore District in the Division of Khulna, Bangladesh. Its administrative centre is the city of Jashore, which is also the centre of the district.

Geography
It has 73,654 households and a total area of 435.40 km2. The town of Jessore is on the banks of the Bhairab River.

Demographics
According to the 2011 Bangladesh census, Jessore Sadar had a population of 742,898. Males constituted 51.19% of the population and females 48.81%. Muslims formed 85.73% of the population, Hindus 8.95%, Christians 5.26% and others 0.05%. Jessore Sadar had a literacy rate of 63.8% for the population 7 years and above.

As of the 1991 Bangladesh census, Jessore Sadar had a population of 530,582. Males constitute 52.85% of the population, and females 47.15%. This Upazila's eighteen-up population was 281,108. Jessore Sadar has an average literacy rate of 44.2% (7+ years), against the national average of 32.4% literate. By the 2011 Bangladesh census, the upazila's population had grown to 742,898.

Administration
Jessore Sadar Upazila is divided into Jessore Municipality and 16 union parishads: Arabpur, Basundia, Chanchra, Churamankati, Diara, Fathehpur, Haibatpur, Ichhali, Kashimpur, Kachua, Lebutala, Narendrapur, Noapara, Ramnagar, Upashahar, and Jessore Cantonment. The union parishads are subdivided into 248 mauzas and 256 villages.

Jessore Municipality is subdivided into 9 wards and 75 mahallas.

It has one of the famous colleges of Bangladesh-Michael Modhushudon (MM) College.

See also
Upazilas of Bangladesh
Districts of Bangladesh
Divisions of Bangladesh

References

Upazilas of Jessore District
Jashore District
Khulna Division